Stephen Smale (born July 15, 1930) is an American mathematician, known for his research in topology, dynamical systems and mathematical economics. He was awarded the Fields Medal in 1966 and spent more than three decades on the mathematics faculty of the University of California, Berkeley (1960–1961 and 1964–1995), where he currently is Professor Emeritus, with research interests in algorithms, numerical analysis and global analysis.

Education and career
Smale was born in Flint, Michigan and entered the University of Michigan in 1948. Initially, he was a good student, placing into an honors calculus sequence taught by Bob Thrall and earning himself A's.  However, his sophomore and junior years were marred with mediocre grades, mostly Bs, Cs and even an F in nuclear physics.  However, with some luck, Smale was accepted as a graduate student at the University of Michigan's mathematics department.  Yet again, Smale performed poorly in his first years, earning a C average as a graduate student.  When the department chair, Hildebrandt, threatened to kick Smale out, he began to take his studies more seriously. Smale finally earned his PhD in 1957, under Raoul Bott, beginning his career as an instructor at the University of Chicago.

Early in his career, Smale was involved in controversy over remarks he made regarding his work habits while proving the higher-dimensional Poincaré conjecture. He said that his best work had been done "on the beaches of Rio." He has been politically active in various movements in the past, such as the Free Speech movement. In 1966, having travelled to Moscow under an NSF grant to accept the Fields Medal, he held a press conference there to denounce the American position in Vietnam, Soviet intervention in Hungary and Soviet maltreatment of intellectuals. After his return to the US, he was unable to renew the grant. At one time he was subpoenaed by the House Un-American Activities Committee.

In 1960, Smale received a Sloan Research Fellowship and was appointed to the Berkeley mathematics faculty, moving to a professorship at Columbia the following year. In 1964 he returned to a professorship at Berkeley, where he has spent the main part of his career. He became a professor emeritus at Berkeley in 1995 and took up a post as professor at the City University of Hong Kong. He also amassed over the years one of the finest private mineral collections in existence. Many of Smale's mineral specimens can be seen in the book—The Smale Collection: Beauty in Natural Crystals.

From 2003 to 2012, Smale was a professor at the Toyota Technological Institute at Chicago; starting August 1, 2009, he became a Distinguished University Professor at the City University of Hong Kong.

In 1988, Smale was the recipient of the Chauvenet Prize of the MAA. In 2007, Smale was awarded the Wolf Prize in mathematics.

Research
Smale proved that the oriented diffeomorphism group of the two-dimensional sphere has the same homotopy type as the special orthogonal group of  matrices. Smale's theorem has been reproved and extended a few times, notably to higher dimensions in the form of the Smale conjecture, as well as to other topological types.

In another early work, he studied the immersions of the two-dimensional sphere into Euclidean space. By relating immersion theory to the algebraic topology of Stiefel manifolds, he was able to fully clarify when two immersions can be deformed into one another through a family of immersions. Directly from his results it followed that the standard immersion of the sphere into three-dimensional space can be deformed (through immersions) into its negation, which is now known as sphere eversion. He also extended his results to higher-dimensional spheres, and his doctoral student Morris Hirsch extended his work to immersions of general smooth manifolds. Along with John Nash's work on isometric immersions, the Hirsch–Smale immersion theory was highly influential in Mikhael Gromov's early work on development of the h-principle, which abstracted and applied their ideas to contexts other than that of immersions.

In the study of dynamical systems, Smale introduced what is now known as a Morse–Smale system. For these dynamical systems, Smale was able to prove Morse inequalities relating the cohomology of the underlying space to the dimensions of the (un)stable manifolds. Part of the significance of these results is from Smale's theorem asserting that the gradient flow of any Morse function can be arbitrarily well approximated by a Morse–Smale system without closed orbits. Using these tools, Smale was able to construct self-indexing Morse functions, where the value of the function equals its Morse index at any critical point. Using these self-indexing Morse functions as a key tool, Smale resolved the generalized Poincaré conjecture in every dimension greater than four. Building on these works, he also established the more powerful h-cobordism theorem the following year, together with the full classification of simply-connected smooth five-dimensional manifolds.

Smale also identified the Smale horseshoe, inspiring much subsequent research. He also outlined a research program carried out by many others. Smale is also known for injecting Morse theory into mathematical economics, as well as recent explorations of various theories of computation.

In 1998 he compiled a list of 18 problems in mathematics to be solved in the 21st century, known as Smale's problems. This list was compiled in the spirit of Hilbert's famous list of problems produced in 1900. In fact, Smale's list contains some of the original Hilbert problems, including the Riemann hypothesis and the second half of Hilbert's sixteenth problem, both of which are still unsolved.  Other famous problems on his list include the Poincaré conjecture (now a theorem, proved by Grigori Perelman), the P = NP problem, and the Navier–Stokes equations, all of which have been designated Millennium Prize Problems by the Clay Mathematics Institute.

Books

Important publications 

 
 
 
 
 
 
 
 

 

 

 *

See also
5-manifold
Axiom A
Geometric mechanics
Homotopy principle
Mean value problem

References

External links 
 
 
 
 
 Robion Kirby, Stephen Smale: The Mathematician Who Broke the Dimension Barrier, a book review of a biography in the Notices of the AMS.

Personal websites at universities
 Steven Smale at the City University of Hong Kong
 Stephen Smale at the University of Chicago
 Steve Smale at the University of California, Berkeley

1930 births
Living people
20th-century American mathematicians
21st-century American mathematicians
American atheists
American computer scientists
Columbia University faculty
Dynamical systems theorists
Fields Medalists
General equilibrium theorists
Institute for Advanced Study visiting scholars
Mathematical economists
Members of the Brazilian Academy of Sciences
Members of the United States National Academy of Sciences
National Medal of Science laureates
Numerical analysts
People from Flint, Michigan
Recipients of the Great Cross of the National Order of Scientific Merit (Brazil)
Theoretical computer scientists
Topologists
University of California, Berkeley College of Letters and Science faculty
University of Chicago faculty
University of Michigan alumni
Wolf Prize in Mathematics laureates
Sloan Research Fellows
Fellows of the Econometric Society
Mathematicians from Michigan